Human Development is a quarterly peer-reviewed scientific journal covering all aspects of human development, particularly developmental psychology. Its scope includes disparate disciplines such as anthropology, biology, education, psychology, and sociology, among others. The journal is published by Karger Publishers (Basel). The journal is the official journal of the Jean Piaget Society. The current editor is Susan Rivera (University of California, Davis). According to the Journal Citation Reports, the journal has a 2019 impact factor of 1.893.

Aims and scope
Distinguished by its international recognition since 1958, Human Development publishes theoretical contributions and integrative reviews of lines of research in psychological development within conceptual, historical, and methodological frameworks. Contributions serve to raise theoretical issues, flesh out interesting and potentially powerful ideas, and differentiate key constructs. Contributions come primarily from developmental psychology but are welcome from other relevant disciplines.

History
The journal was founded in 1958 as Vita Humana by Hans Thomae (1958–1981)
and continued in 1965 as Human Development. Former editors include: Bernice L. Neugarten (1963–1969), M.L. Langeveld (1963–1974), Klaus F. Riegel (1970–1977), John A. Meacham (1977–1987), Wolfgang Edelstein (1982–1987), Hermine Sinclair (1982–1987), Deanna Kuhn (1988–1996), Barbara Rogoff (1997–2002), Geoffrey B. Saxe (2003–2006), Larry Nucci (2007–2019), and Susan Rivera (2020–).

References

External links

Publications established in 1958
Karger academic journals
Bimonthly journals
Developmental psychology journals
English-language journals
French-language journals
German-language journals